Gao Yao was the Minister for Law of Emperor Shun in prehistorical China according to tradition. Gao Yao became a political senior advisor of Yu the Great. His father was Shaohao. He was considered the ancestor of the imperial house of Li of the Tang dynasty, which honoured him with the posthumous name Emperor Deming.

He is cited admonishing his king: "Heaven can see and hear, and does so through the eyes and ears of the people; Heaven rewards the virtuous and punishes the wicked, and does it through the people."

Some Chinese scholars have argued he is the same person as Ye the Great, said by Sima Qian to have been the father of Fei the Great who was later known as Boyi. Ye was reckoned as one of the ancestors of the House of Ying in the Qin and of the ruling house of Zhao. Gao Yao is sometimes considered the father of Boyi.

References

Xia dynasty politicians
Year of death unknown
Year of birth unknown